The Zimbabwe Football Association (ZIFA) is the governing body of football in Zimbabwe. It is responsible for organising national football competitions in Zimbabwe and managing the Zimbabwe national football teams.

The current ZIFA was founded in 1979. It has been affiliated with FIFA since 1965 and has been a member of the CAF since 1980.

In October 2015, Zimbabwe Football Association President, Cuthbert Dube, stepped down after five years in charge. During his tenure, the organisation's debt rose to $6 million and national teams struggled repeatedly to fulfil away assignments due to lack of funds. Dube faced a vote of no confidence at a meeting prior to his resignation.

ZIFA regions
ZIFA has four Regions made up of ten Provinces:
ZIFA Central Region (Provinces: Matebeleland South, Midlands)
ZIFA Eastern Region (Provinces: Manicaland, Masvingo, Mashonaland East)
ZIFA Northern Region (Provinces: Harare, Mashonaland Central, Mashonaland West)
ZIFA Southern Region (Provinces: Bulawayo, Matebeleland North)

Unauthorised matches allegation
In October 2010, Henrietta Rushwaya, the Chief Executive of the ZIFA, was sacked after being found guilty by the Association's disciplinary body on charges of "conduct inconsistent with her duties, mismanagement and insubordination".

Rushwaya was found guilty of sending the national team to play unauthorised matches in Asia in 2009. Her sacking followed her suspension in July 2010 on suspicion of fixing matches in a Malaysian tournament. She was also found guilty of requesting a loan of $103,000 from Zimbabwe's sports commission, an amount that is now unaccounted for.

The national team's matches against Thailand, Syria and a Malaysian club were accepted without the permission of ZIFA's Board or Zimbabwe's Sports Commission, which must authorise foreign trips taken by Zimbabwe teams. Rushwaya also allowed the former Zimbabwe champions Monomotapa to go to Malaysia in 2009 masquerading as the national team of Zimbabwe.

Both tours are suspected of being set up by betting syndicates, a report by the Forum for African Investigative Reporters stated in September 2010.

Rushwaya was acquitted after a fully contested trial and also due to lack of incriminating evidence. Some theorists allege that her prosecution was a conspiracy linked to ZIFA President Cuthbert Dube

References

External links
 
 
  Zimbabwe at FIFA website
 Zimbabwe at CAF Online

Zimbabwe
Football in Zimbabwe
Sports governing bodies in Zimbabwe
Sports organizations established in 1965